The New Directors/New Films Festival is an annual film festival held in New York City, and organized jointly by the Museum of Modern Art and the Film Society of Lincoln Center. Established in 1972, the Festival generally selects films from first-time directors, some of whom have become renowned in their later careers.

The Festival and its films are covered by national periodicals including The New York Times and Variety.

References

Further reading

Film festivals in New York City